Uzès is a commune in the Gard department in the Occitanie region of Southern France. In 2017, it had a population of 8,454.

History

Originally Ucetia or Eutica in Latin, Uzès was a small Gallo-Roman oppidum, or administrative settlement. The most famous stretch of the aqueduct is the Pont du Gard, now a UNESCO World Heritage Site, which carried fresh water over splendid arches across the river Gardon.

Jews were apparently settled there as early as the 5th century. Saint Ferréol, Bishop of Uzès, allegedly admitted them to his table; on this account complaint was made of him to King Childebert I, whereupon the bishop was obliged to change his attitude toward the Jews, compelling all those who would not become Christians to leave Uzès. After his death (581) many who had received baptism returned to Judaism. Jews were expelled from the region in 614.

In early 8th century, Uzès was a fortified civitas and bishopric under the Archbishop of Narbonne. During the Umayyad conquest of Gothic Septimania, Uzès became the northernmost stronghold of Muslim Spain circa 725. Charles Martel went on to lay siege to the stronghold in 736, but it remained in Gothic-Andalusian hands up to 752, when counts loyal to Ansemund of Nîmes handed over a large number of strongholds to the Frankish Pepin the Short. In 753 the stronghold rebelled against the Franks after Ansemund's assassination, but the uprising was suppressed and a Frankish trustee of Pepin imposed.

In the 13th century, Uzès hosted a small community of Jewish scholars, as well as a community of Cathars.

Like many cloth-manufacturing centers (Uzès was known for its serges), the city and the surrounding countryside were strongly Protestant during the Wars of Religion in the 16th century, which wreaked havoc in Languedoc. Numerous of the city's churches were trashed and burned by furious Protestants: only two remain today. One such destroyed and rebuilt church is Saint-Étienne.

Ucetia 
Ucetia is the name of a Gallo-Roman oppidum in the Roman province of Occitania. Its existence was recorded on a list of eleven other settlements on a stela in Nîmes (ancient Nemausus) on which its name appears as "VCETIAE". It was under the administration of Nemausus, to which it provided water via a Roman aqueduct. Ucetia was also known as Castrum Uceciense, which is in the Notitia of the Provinces of Gallia.

In 2017, mosaics discovered by accident during construction at a local high school represented material proof of the existence of Ucetia. The mosaics had depictions of animals such as a deer, an owl, an eagle, and bulls. These have been identified as "honor to the Roman gods". For many European cultures, deer represent deities of the woodlands, and the owl was a symbol of the goddess Athena. Together with the animals there were decorations that included water, geometric shapes, colors, and patterns, including a design with swastika-like elements.

Ucetia was inhabited from at least the 1st century B.C. until the 7th century A.D.

Ucetia and Pont du Gard 
Ucetia was known to have been a source of water carried via aqueduct to many communities, especially ancient Nemausus (Nîmes), which grew to a size of about 30,000 people. The aqueduct system included the Pont du Gard. Construction of the aqueduct led to a "classic Roman tragedy" of greed in the nearby cities and towns that affected Ucetia and other communities.

Geography

Climate

Uzès has a hot-summer Mediterranean climate (Köppen climate classification Csa).

Dukes of Uzès
The title of Duke of Uzès, in the family de Crussol d'Uzès, is the premier title in the peerage of France, coming right after the princes of the blood. The title of seigneur d'Uzès is attested in a charter of 1088. After part of Languedoc was attached to royal demesne (1229), the lords' (and later dukes') military skill and fealty to the Crown propelled their rise through the nobility, until, after the treason of the last Duke of Montmorency, beheaded in 1632, the title of First Duke of France fell to Uzès, who retain their stronghold in the center of town today, which has expanded round the 11th century Tour Bermond. If France were a kingdom, it would be the job of the duke of Uzès to cry out, "Le Roi est mort. Vive le Roi!" at each state funeral, and defend the honour of the queen mother. Twenty-one dukes have been wounded or killed as hereditary Champion of France over the centuries.

Sights

The present-day city retains the trace of its walls as a circuit of boulevards. A Capuchin chapel, built in 1635 to house the mortal remains of the dukes, occupies the site of a 1st-century AD temple dedicated to the first Roman Emperor, Augustus.
There are monuments of the prestige of the former bishopric, once one of the most extensive of Languedoc, but extinguished at the Revolution, and private houses that witness the wealth that the textile trade brought in the 16th century. The town is also homes to three feudal towers, the Bermonde Tower (part of the château du Duché), the Bishop Tower and the Royal Tower.

Uzès Cathedral was destroyed in the Albigensian Crusade, rebuilt, and destroyed again in the 16th century Wars of Religion. Rebuilt again in the 17th century, it was stripped out during the French Revolution. The 11th century  Romanesque Tour Fenestrelle ("Window Tower"), with its paired windows, is probably the most famous icon of the city. It was listed as a French Historical Monument in 1862.

Uzès is famous in the area for its Saturday market.  Not only does the market offer local produce, but it also boasts textiles made in the region and many tourist delights.

Economy 
Tourism is one of the key industrial sectors, alongside the local arts scene and wine making.

The region has a long history in the production of licorice. The German company Haribo maintains a factory and museum in Uzès, which traces its roots back to the licorice factory Henri Lefont opened there in 1862. His company later merged with Ricqlès, and was then taken over by Haribo.

Population

Notable people
 Firmin Abauzit (1679–1767), scholar who worked on physics, theology and philosophy
 Vice-Admiral François-Paul Brueys D'Aigalliers, Count de Brueys, (1753–1798), the French commander in the Battle of the Nile.
Oliver Bevan (2001-) English artist
Jérôme Cintas (1971-) French former professional footballer
 Leon Krier, urbanist
 Dhuoda, duchess consort of Septimania and writer of the Liber Manualis
 Bernard Plantapilosa, Count of Auvergne and second son of Dhuoda
 David Redfern (1936–2014) English music photographer
 Suzanne Verdier (1745–1813), writer

See also
 Bishopric of Uzès
 Viscounts and Dukes of Uzès
 Philip O'Connor
Communes of the Gard department

References

Further reading

External links

 Official website 
 Tourist office website

Communes of Gard
Languedoc